Robert Emmerson Oliver Johnson (25 October 1911 – 5 March 1982) was an English professional footballer who played as a central defender.

References

1911 births
1982 deaths
People from Houghton-le-Spring
Footballers from Tyne and Wear
English footballers
Association football defenders
Burnley F.C. players
Nelson F.C. players
Rochdale A.F.C. players
English Football League players
Bishop Auckland F.C. players